Van Hage is a British-based garden centre chain. The chain currently operates three centres, two in Hertfordshire and one in Peterborough, Cambridgeshire.

History
Theadora Warmerdam, (a co-founder of Van Hage) was evacuated from the Netherlands to England during the Second World War in 1940. As the eldest of six children Theadora took over the running of the family business at the age of 20 when her father died in 1948.

Cornelius Van Hage, (another co-founder of Van Hage) a young entrepreneur who exported bulbs from the Netherlands to the UK. He met Theadora and they were married in 1953. During the same year they opened a nursery on the site of a run down pig farm at Spitalbrook in Broxbourne.

The Van Hages saw the opportunity to create a garden centre with a difference from the experience they had gained. They purchased  the famous rose nursery of Chaplin Brothers at Gt. Amwell. The garden centre was formally opened by Percy Thrower, the top national gardening celebrity of the 1970s.

Van Hage has continued to grow and develop into one of the largest and most prominent garden and leisure retailers in the United Kingdom. As part of this development in 1996 a second garden centre was purchased, Chenies, in Amersham.

In more recent years, the company has added another centre to its portfolio. This being at the new Peterborough Garden Park development in Peterborough, Cambs UK. The Van Hage Garden Centre takes centre stage as part of the development which includes a number of smaller retail units.

Awards
The company has received a number of industry awards. These include Best Houseplant Centre in the UK, Best Plant Area, Best Garden Centre, Best Christmas Display, Best UK Flower Bulb Display and a ‘Best Garden in Show' at Chelsea, receiving the Fiskars Sword of Excellence.
In 2002 the Van Hage team won a gold medal at the Chelsea Flower Show for their ‘Bridal Garden'.

Centres
 Van Hage Peterborough is located in part of the Peterborough Garden Park development. 
 Van Hage Great Amwell
 Van Hage Chenies near Rickmansworth

Reference List

Organizations established in 1968
Horticultural companies of the United Kingdom